Anila Bhediya is an Indian politician and current Minister of Child and Woman Welfare in government of Chhattisgarh. She is a  member of the Chhattisgarh Legislative Assembly representing the Daundi Lohara Vidhan Sabha constituency of Chhattisgarh and Indian National Congress politician.

References 

Living people
Indian National Congress politicians
Chhattisgarh MLAs 2018–2023
Year of birth missing (living people)